Ian McCulloch may refer to:

 Ian McCulloch (actor) (born 1939), British actor
 Ian McCulloch (singer) (born 1959), English singer, notably of Echo and the Bunnymen
 Ian McCulloch (snooker player) (born 1971), English snooker player
 Ian McCulloch (footballer) (born 1948), Australian rules football player for Fitzroy and East Perth

See also
 Iain McCulloch (born 1954), Scottish footballer (Kilmarnock and Notts County)
 Iain McCulloch (academic), professor of polymer materials